Eucalyptus farinosa is a species of small tree that is endemic to Queensland. It has hard, dark grey ironbark, egg-shaped to lance-shaped adult leaves, flower buds in groups of seven, white flowers and cup-shaped to barrel-shaped and ribbed fruit.

Description
It has hard, dark grey to black bark to the small branches. Flowering has been recorded in October and the flowers are white.

Taxonomy and naming
Eucalyptus farinosa was first formally described in 1997 by Ken Hill from a specimen collected by Ian Brooker on Mount Stewart near Charters Towers and the description was published in the journal Telopea. The specific epithet (farinosa) is from a Latin word meaning "floury" or "mealy", referring to the coating on the leaves, buds and fruit of this species.

Distribution
This tree is only known from the type location near the Campaspe River and Mount Stewart in Queensland.

Conservation status
This eucalypt is classified as "least concern" under the Queensland Government Nature Conservation Act 1992.

See also
List of Eucalyptus species

References

Flora of Queensland
farinosa
Myrtales of Australia
Plants described in 1997